The 2017 Campeonato da Primeira Divisão de Futebol Profissional da FGF, better known as the 2017 Campeonato Gaúcho, was the 97th season of Rio Grande do Sul's top-flight football league. The season began in January and ends in May.

Participating teams

First phase

Knockout stage

Bracket

Final

Awards

Team of the year

Player of the Season
The Player of the Year was awarded to Matheus.

Newcomer of the Season
The Newcomer of the Year was awarded to Sander.

Top scorer of the Season
The top scorer of the season was Brenner and Miller Bolaños, who scored seven goals each.

References

Campeonato Gaúcho seasons